The 1896 United States presidential election in Nevada took place on November 3, 1896. All contemporary 45 states were part of the 1896 United States presidential election. State voters chose three electors to the Electoral College, which selected the president and vice president.

Nevada was won by the Democratic nominees, former U.S. Representative William Jennings Bryan of Nebraska and his running mate Arthur Sewall of Maine.

Bryan would later defeat Republican William McKinley in the state four years later and would also later defeat William Howard Taft in the state in 1908. Bryan's performance remains the strongest of any presidential nominee in the history of the state.

Results

Results by county

Notes

References

Nevada
1896
1896 Nevada elections